USS Aristaeus (ARB-1) was planned as a United States Navy , but was redesignated as one of twelve Aristaeus-class battle damage repair ships built for the United States Navy during World War II. The lead ship in her class, she was named for Aristaeus (in Greek mythology, the son of Apollo and the huntress Cyrene), the only US Naval vessel to bear the name.

Construction
The ship was laid down as LST-329 on 12 November 1942, at the Philadelphia Navy Yard; reclassified  ARB-1 on 25 January 1943; launched on 1 February 1943; sponsored by Mrs. Arthur Taylor; converted at Fairfield, Maryland, by the Maryland Drydock Company for service as a battle damage repair ship; and commissioned on 18 May 1943.

Service history
On 1 June, the ship got underway for Norfolk, Virginia. During the next six weeks, she conducted shakedown training out of Norfolk and in the Chesapeake Bay. On 23 July, she left the east coast and shaped a course for the Pacific. The vessel transited the Panama Canal and joined the Pacific Fleet on 1 August. She then continued on via Bora Bora, the Society Islands, and Tutuila, American Samoa to Nouméa, New Caledonia.
 
Aristaeus reached Nouméa on 14 September, and operated in its immediate vicinity through the remainder of 1943, and the first six months of 1944. Early in July 1944, she anchored at Sydney, Australia. After upkeep at that port, the repair ship journeyed to New Guinea, in late September, and provided battle damage repairs to vessels in this area into April 1945. On 1 May, she anchored at Kerama Retto in the Ryukyu Islands.

The vessel remained at Kerama Retto during the next two months. As a member of Service Squadron (ServRon) 10, she performed battle damage and voyage repairs to various ships of the fleet. On 2 July, the ship moved her base of operations to Buckner Bay, Okinawa, where she provided routine repair services. On 13 August, she was ordered to assist in repairing the torpedoed battleship . Many of Pennsylvanias compartments were flooded, and she had settled heavily by the stern. Aristaeus repair efforts, however, enabled the battleship to get underway for Pearl Harbor on 24 August, nine days after the Japanese capitulation ended hostilities.

Post-war service
Aristaeus remained at Buckner Bay until early December. She left Okinawa on 3 December, and shaped a course for the west coast of the United States. The ship reached San Francisco, California, on 27 December, and entered a period of upkeep and repairs. She remained at San Francisco until 22 May 1946, when she got underway for San Diego. Upon her arrival there, the vessel reported to the San Diego Group, 19th Fleet, for inactivation. Aristaeus was decommissioned on 15 January 1947, and was placed in the Pacific Reserve Fleet. Her name was struck from the Naval Vessel Register on 1 July 1961. The vessel was sold to Brown Industries, Inc. of Oakland, California on 14 March 1962, and was subsequently scrapped.

Awards
Aristaeus earned one battle star for her World War II service.

Notes

Citations

Bibliography 

Online resources

External links
 

 

Aristaeus-class repair ships
Aristaeus-class repair ships converted from LST-1-class ships
Ships built in Philadelphia
1943 ships
World War II auxiliary ships of the United States
Pacific Reserve Fleet, San Diego